St. Thomas Aquinas or STA is a catholic secondary school in Brampton, Ontario.  It has an arts program consisting of drama, dance, vocals, instrumental music and visual arts. It is one of two secondary schools with an arts program under Dufferin-Peel Catholic District School Board including St. Roch Catholic Secondary School. Another art school which is public and located in Brampton is Mayfield Secondary School.

Location
St. Thomas Aquinas Secondary School, one of the oldest school communities in Brampton, originally occupied a new building at 115 Glenvale Boulevard (built in the Bramalea G-section in 1975), opening for classes in September 1976 with an enrollment of 500 students and offering Grades 7-10 (by 1982 Grades 9-13 were offered). A "portapak" addition was built in the Fall of 1980 on the south side of the building, and increasing amounts of portables were also added to handle increasing enrollment over the years.

The school changed locations to its current building at 25 Corporation Dr. near Torbram in 1992, due to increasing student enrollment. The old building at 115 Glenvale became a holding school, housing the new regional school for the north region, Robert F. Hall Catholic Secondary School and eventually housing St. Marguerite d'Youville SS for a number of years.  It is currently the home of Holy Name of Mary CSS.

The present 3-story, 17 acre location at 25 Corporation Dr. went through renovations to add the "new section" in 2001. The section consists of English classes and the Brian J. Dunn theatre.

Alumni
 Anthony Gale, Olympic Sledge Hockey, Bronze Medalist, 2014
 Luciano Borsato, former professional NHL hockey player
 Sean Monahan, NHL hockey player who currently plays for the Montreal Canadiens
 David J. Phillips, actor/producer in Hollywood
 Jessie Reyez, singer/songwriter
 Kwasi Poku, Footballer who currently plays for Forge FC in the Canadian Premier League
 Lowell Wright, Footballer who currently plays for York United in the Canadian Premier League
 Ezequiel Carrasco, Footballer

See also
List of high schools in Ontario

References

External links
School website

High schools in Brampton
Catholic secondary schools in Ontario
 Educational institutions established in 1976
1976 establishments in Ontario
Art schools in Canada
Relocated schools